Diala suturalis is a species of sea snail, a marine gastropod mollusk in the family Dialidae.

Description
The shell grows to a length of 13 mm

Distribution
This species is distributed in the Western Indian Ocean and along Southern Australia and Tasmania.

References

 Richmond, M. (Ed.) (1997). A guide to the seashores of Eastern Africa and the Western Indian Ocean islands. Sida/Department for Research Cooperation, SAREC: Stockholm, Sweden. . 448 pp
 C Hedley, Studies on Australian Mollusca. Part XI; Proceedings of the Linnean Society of New South Wales, 38: 258–339, 1913

External links

Dialidae
Gastropods described in 1863